Vítězslav Lavička (born 30 April 1963) is a Czech football manager and former player.

Playing career
As a player, Lavička played for several Czech clubs, including Škoda Plzeň, RH Cheb and Sparta Prague. He played one season towards the end of his career in the Gambrinus liga after the Czech Republic's national league commenced play in 1993.

Managerial career
In 2006 and 2007, he was voted Coach of the Year at the Czech Golden Ball awards and Coach of the Year in 2006.

In June 2008, Lavička signed a two-year contract as the manager of Sparta Prague. However, after just four months in the position, he resigned following a humiliating 4–1 home defeat against Sparta's rivals Slavia.

On Wednesday 4 February 2009, he was appointed the new manager of Australian A-League club Sydney FC along with Czech counterpart Michal Zach as assistant coach.
Lavička has re-signed to manage Sydney FC for the 2010–2011 season in a bid to get the club another A-League title. He was successful in managing Sydney to their second title in the 09/10 A-League season. It was 05/06 when Sydney won their first title. He will also be looking to guide them to an Asian Champions League title in 10/11.

Sydney FC
In the pre-season to A-League season 2009/2010, Lavička guided Sydney FC through a program of 12 matches against local teams and A-League opponents undefeated, scoring 25 goals and conceding 1 goal in over 1080 minutes of football.

In Lavička's first league match of the 2009/2010 season Sydney FC ran out 3–2 winners, against expansion team North Queensland Fury, played in Townsville. The match also featured the A-League debut of Robbie Fowler for the Fury. He has been praised for bringing an impressive new style of football to the club.

Sydney then went on to win the A-League Minor Premiership after finishing narrowly ahead of Melbourne Victory and Gold Coast United, also securing them an Asian Champions League spot.

Lavička was voted A-League coach of the year for the 2009–2010 season by players in the league as part of the Professional Footballers Australia awards. His brilliant first season was rounded off as Sydney FC defeated Melbourne Victory in the A-League Grand Final after a penalty shootout victory at Etihad Stadium.

Lavička's second season started poorly, with the team not winning a game until round 11 against Perth Glory. Lavička who is afraid of heights, said that if his team wins he will climb the Sydney Harbour Bridge, which he did.

It was announced on 3 February 2012 that Lavička would not have his contract renewed by Sydney FC, a mutual agreement between the board and Lavička himself, believed to have come about after he expressed that he was missing his family back in the Czech Republic. Lavicka stayed as manager until the end of the 2011–12 A-League season before departing.

Sparta Prague
After joining Sparta Prague in 2012, Lavička took them to the knockout stages of the 2012-13 Europa League. Sparta defeated Feyenoord 4–2 on aggregate to reach the group stage, where they finished second behind Lyon. Sparta were knocked out in the round of 32 by Chelsea, losing 1–2 in aggregate which included a 1–1 draw at home.

In the 2013-14 Czech league, Sparta Prague finished first, obtaining 79 points from 30 games and losing only once. Lavička followed up this success by winning the Czech cup in the same season, defeating Rivals (and league runner up) Viktoria Plzen on penalties. Sparta went on to win the 2014 Czech Supercup 3–0, once again against rivals Plzen.

Czech Republic U21
Lavička signed on as the Under 21 Czech Republic manager in 2015, prior to the start of qualification for the 2017 European Under 21 championship. Lavička guided the team to the top of their qualification group with 7 wins, 2 draws and 1 loss from 10 games, resulting in direct qualification to the final tournament.

Kuwait
On 21 February 2022, Lavička became the manager of Kuwait national team.

After failing to qualify for the 2023 AFC Asian Cup with defeats to Indonesia and Jordan, Lavička immediately resigns as Kuwait manager.

Managerial statistics

Honours

Managerial
 FC Slovan Liberec
Czech First League: 2005–06

 Sydney FC
 A-League Premiership: 2009–2010
 A-League Championship: 2009–2010

 AC Sparta Prague
Czech First League: 2013–14
Czech Cup: 2013–14
Czech Supercup: 2014

Individual
 Czech Coach of the Year: 2006, 2016
 Sydney FC Hall of Fame: 2015

References

External links
 Sydney FC profile

1963 births
Living people
Czech footballers
Czechoslovak footballers
Czech First League players
AC Sparta Prague players
FC Viktoria Plzeň players
FK Hvězda Cheb players
Sportspeople from Plzeň
Czech football managers
Czech expatriate football managers
Czech First League managers
AC Sparta Prague managers
FK Viktoria Žižkov managers
FC Slovan Liberec managers
Sydney FC managers
Śląsk Wrocław managers
Expatriate soccer managers in Australia
A-League Men managers
Czech expatriate sportspeople in Australia
Association football midfielders
Expatriate football managers in Poland
Czech expatriate sportspeople in Kuwait
Expatriate football managers in Kuwait
Kuwait national football team managers